Miss Ann is an expression used inside the African-American community to refer to a European-American woman (or sometimes a black woman) who is arrogant and condescending in her attitude.

The characteristics associated with someone called a "Miss Ann" include being considered "uppity", or in the case of a black woman, "acting white". 

Like the male counterpart term, Mister Charlie, the term Miss Ann was once common among many African-Americans. It was a pejorative way of commenting on imperious behaviour from white women, particularly when it came with racist undertones. It is seldom used among young African-Americans today, instead the term “Karen” has come into further usage amongst people of all races in the United States.

In popular culture 

Miss Anne: “A White Woman”
—Zora Neale Hurston, Glossary of Harlem Slang

Ann; Miss Ann: Coded term for any white female. [i.e.] “His mama washes clothes on Wednesday for Miss Ann.”
—Clarence Major, From Juba to Jive: A Dictionary of African-American Slang

Ann: (1) A derisive term for a white woman … Also “Miss Ann.”
—Geneva Smitherman, Black Talk

Miss Ann and Mister Eddie: Emancipated bluebloods.
—Emmanuel Taylor Gordon, Born to Be

"I’d remind them please, look at those knees, you got at Miss Ann’s scrubbing."
–Maya Angelou, Sepia Fashion Show

"Oh, oh, oh, Miss Ann, you're doing something no one can…"
–"Miss Ann" song by Little Richard. Here the singer may be referring to the white woman, Ann Johnson, who mothered him as a young teenager, twisting the standard connotation in ambiguous ways.

See also
House Negro
Mister Charlie
Uncle Tom
Karen (slang)

References

African-American slang
African-American cultural history
Pejorative terms for white women
Misogyny